The 2006–07 season of the Ford Ranger One Day Cup was the 38th season of the domestic one-day cricket competition played in Australia.  It involved 30 group matches and a final match.  The Queensland Bulls defeated the Victorian Bushrangers in the final, played at the Melbourne Cricket Ground.

Squads
Victoria
 Cricket Australia contract: Brad Hodge, Shane Warne, Cameron White
 State contract: Jason Arnberger, Rob Cassell, Adam Crosthwaite, Gerard Denton, Shane Harwood, David Hussey, Nick Jewell, Michael Klinger, Brad Knowles, Michael Lewis, Lloyd Mash, Andrew McDonald, Jon Moss, Dirk Nannes, Peter Siddle, Allan Wise
 Rookie contract: Grant Baldwin, Aiden Blizzard, Aaron Finch, Matthew Gale, Jon Holland, Peter Nevill

New South Wales
 Cricket Australia contract: Nathan Bracken, Stuart Clark, Michael Clarke, Brad Haddin, Phil Jaques, Simon Katich, Brett Lee, Glenn McGrath, and Stuart MacGill
 State contract: Aaron Bird, Doug Bollinger, Mark Cameron, Beau Casson, Ed Cowan, Scott Coyte, Murray Creed, Nathan Hauritz, Moises Henriques, Jason Krejza, Grant Lambert, Tim Lang, Greg Mail, Matthew Nicholson, Aaron O’Brien, James Packman, Grant Roden, Craig Simmons, Daniel Smith, Dominic Thornely
 Rookie contract: Tom Cooper, Peter Forrest, John Hastings, Usman Khawaja, Stephen O’Keefe, Martin Paskal, David Warner

Queensland
 Cricket Australia contract: Matthew Hayden, Mitchell Johnson, Michael Kasprowicz, Andrew Symonds, Shane Watson
 State contract: Andy Bichel, Ryan Broad, Daniel Doran, Chris Hartley, James Hopes, Shane Jurgensen, Nick Kruger, Martin Love, Jimmy Maher, Brendan Nash, Ashley Noffke, Clinton Perren, Craig Philipson, Nathan Rimmington, Chris Simpson, Lachlan Stevens, Grant Sullivan
 Rookie contracts: Murray Bragg, Ben Cutting, Ryan LeLoux, Nathan Reardon

South Australia
 Cricket Australia contract: Daniel Cullen, Jason Gillespie, Shaun Tait
 State contract: Nathan Adcock, Cullen Bailey, Greg Blewett, Cameron Borgas, Ben Cameron, Mark Cleary, Mark Cosgrove, Shane Deitz, Matthew Elliott, Callum Ferguson, Daniel Harris, Ryan Harris, Trent Kelly, Darren Lehmann, Graham Manou, Gary Putland, Paul Rofe
 Rookie contract: Lachlan Oswald-Jacobs, Tom Plant, Simon Roberts, Chadd Sayers, Ken Skewes

Western Australia
 Cricket Australia contract: Adam Gilchrist, Brad Hogg, Mike Hussey, Justin Langer, Damien Martyn
 State contract: David Bandy, Brett Dorey, Ben Edmondson, Sean Ervine, Shawn Gillies, Aaron Heal, Clint Heron, Mathew Inness, Andrew James, Tim MacDonald, Steve Magoffin, Shaun Marsh, Scott Meuleman, Marcus North, Chris Rogers, Luke Ronchi, Adam Voges, Darren Wates, Peter Worthington
 Rookie contract: Arron Crawford, Nathan Coulter-Nile, Liam Davis, Theo Doropoulos, Craig King, Josh Mangan, Luke Pomersbach

Tasmania
 Cricket Australia contract: Ricky Ponting
 State contract: George Bailey, Michael Bevan, Travis Birt, Luke Butterworth, Sean Clingeleffer, David Dawson, Michael Dighton, Michael Di Venuto, Xavier Doherty, Andrew Downtown, Brendan Drew, Brett Geeves, Adam Griffith, Ben Hilfenhaus, Dan Marsh, Tim Paine, Damien Wright
 Rookie contract: Dane Anderson, Alex Doolan, Chris Duval, Jason Shelton, Matthew Wade, Jonathon Wells
 Squad members: Nick Grainer, Scott Kremerskothen, Rhett Lockyear, Darren McNees, Adam Polkinghorne, Jade Selby, Luke Swards, Nathan Wegman

Group stage table

Fixtures

Group matches

Final

References

External links
 Cricket Australia
 Australia | Cricket | Home | ESPN Cricinfo

Ford Ranger One Day Cup Season, 2006-07
Australian domestic limited-overs cricket tournament seasons
Domestic cricket competitions in 2006–07